Arbanus (also Romanized as Arbanūs) is a village in Behi Dehbokri Rural District, Simmineh District, Bukan County, West Azerbaijan Province, Iran. At the 2006 census, its population was 202, in 37 families.

References 

Populated places in Bukan County